Ninür is the nineteenth album by the Norwegian electronic dance music producer Aleksander Vinter, and his first using the Savant stage name.

Track listing
"You Can Play" - 4:09
"Bach to the Phuture" - 1:53
"Ocarine" - 3:47
"Ninür" - 4:46
"The Third Eye" - 4:01
"Gunslinger Jones" - 6:10
"I Want You" - 3:37
"Rabbit Whore" (feat. Blood Command) - 5:29
"Rollercoaster" - 4:05
"Holy Ghost" - 3:51
"Make You Dream" - 4:03
"The A Team" - 4:53
"Omni" (feat. Vinter in Hollywood) - 7:37

References

External links
 http://vinter.us/index.php/music/ninur/

2011 albums
Savant (musician) albums